Aiphanes leiostachys is a species of palm that is endemic to Colombia.  Known from only a few forest fragments in the Cordillera Central, it is threatened by habitat loss and forest management practices.

Description
Individuals are usually multi-stemmed, with up to 10 stems, but occasionally are single-stemmed. Stems bear about 11 leaves which consists of a leaf sheath, a petiole and a rachis. Leaves each bear 17 to 20 pairs of leaflets which are arranged in three vertical rows.

The female flowers are slightly larger— long. The fruit have not been described.

Taxonomy
The species was first described by German botanist Max Burret in 1932, based on a collection made in 1880.  Since the original collection was destroyed when the Berlin Herbarium was bombed during the Second World War, a neotype has been designated.

Distribution and status
Aiphanes leiostachys is endemic to Colombia where it is known from only a few forest fragments in the Cordillera Central in an area that has largely been deforested.  Given its limited range and the continuing pressures of forest conversion for agriculture and plantation forestry, it is classified as an endangered species.

References

leiostachys
Endemic flora of Colombia
Endangered plants
Taxonomy articles created by Polbot
Taxa named by Max Burret